"Walk" is the debut single of British singer Kwabs. The song was released on 26 September 2014 on Atlantic Records in the UK, becoming a minor hit. However, the song became hugely popular in Germany, reaching number one in January 2015. In Austria and Switzerland, the song reached the top five positions. It is also featured on the soundtrack of EA Sports video game FIFA 15. A version featuring Fetty Wap was released on 21 August 2015.

Track listing

Walk EP
Kwabs also released an EP on 3 October 2014 on Atlantic with the following tracks:

Remix
Drum-and-bass producer Nu:Tone released a remix of the song in 2017.

Chart performance

Weekly charts

Year-end charts

Certifications

References

2014 singles
2014 songs
Atlantic Records singles
Songs written by Jonny Lattimer
Number-one singles in Germany